Hawise or Hadewis (lived early 12th century), whose origin and parentage are unknown, was the wife of  William fitzBaderon, who held Monmouth, Wales and lived in Monmouth Castle from the year 1082 on the orders of King William I of England. Monmouth was previously held by William's uncle, Withenoc, who never married and retired from this charge to become a monk. Hawise is the first woman resident of Monmouth whose name is recorded.

Hawise and William fitzBaderon had two daughters and one son:

 Iveta and Advenia were their daughters, one of whom married a member of the de Cormeilles family. The children of this marriage, grandsons to Hawise and William, were Richard, Robert and Alexander de Cormeilles.
 Baderon fitzWilliam was their son. He was his father's successor as lord of Monmouth and held the lordship until about 1170/1176.

In 1101, when William presented the newly completed St Mary's Priory Church and its attached Priory to the parent Abbey of Saint-Florent de Saumur, along with the revenues of several local churches, the donation was formally confirmed by Hawise, Iveta and Advenia. On 18 March 1101 or 1102 the Priory Church was consecrated by Hervey le Breton, bishop of Bangor, in the presence of abbot William of Saint-Florent de Saumur and of Bernard, King Henry I's chaplain. On this occasion Hawise and her two daughters made crosses that were used in the ceremonial.

References

Further reading 
 H. Guillotel, "Une famille bretonne au service du Conquérant: les Baderon" in Droit privé et Institutions régionales: études historiques offertes à Jean Yver (Paris: Presses Universitaires de France, 1974) pp. 361–367 Selected pages at Google Books
 K. S. B. Keats-Rohan, Domesday people: Prosopography of persons occurring in English documents, 1066-1166 vol. 1 (Boydell & Brewer, 1999) p. 484 etc. Selected pages at Google Books
 Keith Kissack, Mediaeval Monmouth (Monmouth: Monmouth Historical and Educational Trust, 1974)

External links 
 William fitzBaderon and Hawise at Medlands

Anglo-Normans in Wales
People from Monmouth, Wales